Maffett is a surname. Notable people with the surname include:

Debra Maffett (born 1956), Miss America 1983
James Thompson Maffett (1837–1912), Republican member of the U.S. House of Representatives from Pennsylvania
Robert Clayton Maffett (1836–1865), officer in the Confederate States Army during the American Civil War

See also
Moffett (surname)